May It Please the Court is a South Korean streaming television series directed by Kang Min-goo and starring Jung Ryeo-won, Lee Kyu-hyung, Jung Jin-young, and Kim Hye-eun. It was released on all Disney Streaming services on September 21, 2022, including Hulu in United States and Star by Disney+ in selected regions. This drama is an adaptation of the book "Let Me Start the Argument" by Jeong Hye-jin, a lawyer who specializes in public defenders and has been defending the socially disadvantaged, and will feature vivid stories of real-life cases from the book.

Synopsis
Noh Chak-Hee, a brilliant but ruthless corporate lawyer, is the adopted "granddaughter" of the founder of Seoul's most prominent law firm. Just as she is about to receive a promotion to partner after successfully defending a pharmaceutical company for manufacturing harmful birth control pills, the police arrest her for manipulating a woman who had taken the pills into attempting suicide. She is suspended by her firm for a year and is forced to take a job working as a member of the Seoul public defender's office.

As a public defender, she shares an office with Jwa Si-Baek, a top graduate from the Judicial Research and Training Institute. Instead of becoming a judge, prosecutor, or attorney at a big law firm, he chose to work in the least profitable and least respected legal profession: public defender. He is enthusiastic with his work but also hides a mysterious part of his personal life that nobody knows about. Noh Chak-Hee and Jwa Si-Baek don't get along very well, but a serial murder case brings them together, and as they try to solve the case more secrets unfold, and they grow to trust each-other.

Cast
 Jung Ryeo-won as Noh Chak-hee, an ace lawyer with the highest winning rate in a big law firm, Jangsan, who becomes a public defender.
 Lee Kyu-hyung as Jwa Si-baek, a public defender often referred to as crazy and eccentric.
 Jung Jin-young as Jang Ki-do, CEO of Jangsan Law Firm.
 Kim Hye-eun as Oh Ha-ran, wife of Jang Ki-do. 
 Lee Sang-hee as Yoo Gyeong-jin, a detective at the Metropolitan Crime Investigation Unit.
 Kim Sang-ho as Shin Chi-sik, owner of Mokgol Dumplings.
 Park So-jin as Jang Yi-yeon, daughter of Jang Ki-do.
 Hong Seo-joon as Oh Dae-hyeon, a strategist who helps and supports Jang Ki-do's ambitions.
 Ko Kyu-pil as Do Young-soo, a clerk at the office of a public lawyer.
 Park Jung-hak as Yoon Seok-goo, CEO of Ilshin Electric.
 Ryu Seong-hyun as Cho Hyun-sik, CEO of Kang Sung Pharmaceutical.
 Noh Sang-bo as Kang Sang-man, a prosecutor who often fights with Noh Chak-hee in court.
 Jung Min-seong as Han Dal-jae, a character who is confused because of the loss of his past memories as an employee of Mokgol Dumplings.
Min Seong-wook as Park Byeong-jae, A journalist with a history of being sued two years ago for spreading false information.
Kim So-yi as Choi Yun-jeong, who suffers from schizophrenia.

Production
In December 2021, Jung Ryeo-won was offered the role of lawyer Noh Chak-hee in the series. Her agency H& Entertainment informed that she was considering it positively. This series marks her comeback after three years, since she last appeared in 2019 TV series Diary of a Prosecutor. The series directed by Kang Min-goo and written by Kim Dan, is produced by Arc Media and Slingshot Studio.

Principal photography began on January 22, 2022 and filming was wrapped up on June 15, 2022.

References

External links
  
 
 
 May It Please the Court at Daum 

Korean-language television shows
2022 South Korean television series debuts
South Korean legal television series
South Korean drama web series
South Korean web series
Star (Disney+) original programming